Christian genocide may refer to:

Armenian genocide
Assyrian genocide
Greek genocide
Genocide of Christians by ISIL